Sultan Sharif Ali Secondary School (abbreviated as SMSSA) is a government secondary school located in Salambigar in Brunei-Muara District, Brunei. The school provides five years of secondary education, leading up to GCE 'O' Level qualification.

Name 
The school is named after Sultan Sharif Ali, the third Sultan of Brunei who ruled in the 15th century.

History 
Sultan Sharif Ali Secondary School began admitting students on 4 June 1990 as Sekolah Menengah Kampung Salambigar (Kampung Salambigar Secondary School). The students previously studied at Pengiran Isteri Hajjah Mariam Secondary School, Sultan Omar Ali Saifuddien College, Sekolah Tinggi Perempuan Raja Isteri (Raja Isteri Girls' High School) and Sultan Muhammad Jamalul Alam Secondary School.

The school was eventually renamed as to its present name on 25 September 1992.

See also 
 List of secondary schools in Brunei

References 

Secondary schools in Brunei
Cambridge schools in Brunei